Thruxton Karting Circuit is a kart racing circuit situated at Thruxton Circuit in Hampshire. At 1,100 metres long, the full circuit has a variety of fast, slow and technical corners.

The centre has a hospitality building and often hosts the British Schools Karting Championship and various endurance races and championships.

Key Information
There are a total of five track layouts:

Club Circuit (365m, 146m, 130m variations)

National Circuit (1100m, 900m variations)

There are 3 different types of Karts:

Motorsport venues in England
Kart circuits

4.0hp Cadet Karts for drivers of 8+

5.5hp Stratos Karts for drivers of 12+

13hp Thunderkarts for drivers of 15+